The New South Wales Minister for Emergency Services and Resilience is a minister within the Government of New South Wales who has the oversight of the emergency service agencies and Resilience NSW.

The portfolio is administered through the Communities and Justice cluster. In March 2022 the New South Wales Premier appointed Steph Cooke MP as the Minister for Flood Recovery.

Agencies 
The following agencies are responsible to the Minister for Emergency Services and Resilience:

 Fire and Rescue NSW
 NSW Rural Fire Service
 NSW State Emergency Service
 Resilience NSW

History 
The National Emergency Services Agency commenced operation on 1 February 1939. The agency was formed in response to a request from the Prime Minister that the Australian states devise a scheme for the protection of the civilian population against possible attacks from the air in the event of a national attack. The first minister Michael Bruxner stated that the objective of the organisation was not just air raids, but to deal with any major catastrophe, such as fires or floods, including the co-ordination of existing organisations such as the Ambulance, the Fire Brigades, the Red Cross, and the Police Department. The portfolio was abolished after the war.

It was recreated in 1982 in the fourth Wran ministry, combined with the portfolio of Police. The emergency services included New South Wales Fire Brigades, Department of Bush Fire Services and the State Emergency Service. While the Ambulance Service is an emergency service, it has not been part of the responsibilities of this portfolio, instead being the responsibility of the Minister for Health. The portfolio has frequently been held in conjunction with the portfolios of either Police or Corrective Services.

List of ministers

Emergency Services and Resilience 
The following individuals have served as Minister for Emergency Services and Resilience, or any precedent titles:

Flood Recovery 
The following individuals have served as Minister for Flood Recovery, or any precedent titles:

See also 

 List of New South Wales government agencies

Notes

References 

Emergency Services and Resilience